Xabier Anduaga is a Spanish operatic tenor. He was both joint first prize winner of the Operalia competition held in Prague in 2019 and joint recipient of the prize for zarzuela there.

Biography
Xabier Anduaga was born in 1995 in San Sebastián, Spain and studied at the Musikene College of Music. In 2016 he participated in the Accademia Rossiniana in Pesaro where he appeared in the featured role of Cavalier Belfiore in Rossini's opera Il viaggio a Reims. He made his professional debut in staged opera at the Teatro Arriaga, Bilbao as the Prince in Rossini's La Cenerentola in 2016. He subsequently appeared in Rossini's Le siège de Corinthe and other roles at the Rossini Opera Festival
Anduaga has performed the leading role of the Conte Almaviva in Il Barbiere di Siviglia of Rossini in St. Petersburg, Rouen, Beijing, Parma, Paris and Naples.

References 

1995 births
Living people
Spanish operatic tenors
21st-century Spanish male opera singers